Deno  may refer to:

People
 Deno (singer) (born 2002), English singer and actor
 Deno Andrews (born 1971), American billiards player
 Dave Deno (born 1956 or 1957), American businessman
 Lottie Deno (1844–1934), American gambler

Other uses
 Deno (Rila), a peak in the eastern part of the Rila Mountain, Bulgaria
 Deno (software), a JavaScript/TypeScript runtime
 Deno language, spoken in Nigeria
 Deno's Wonder Wheel Amusement Park, Coney Island, US

See also
 Denno (disambiguation)
 Dino (disambiguation)
 Dyno (disambiguation)
 Dano (disambiguation)
 Deino (mythology)
 Deino (Pokémon)